Ly Seppel (born 30 April 1943) is an Estonian poet and translator.

Biography
Ly Seppel was born 30 April 1943.

She graduated from the University of Tartu in 1967. She studied Estonian philology there and Turkic languages in Baku and Moscow. She later studied psychotherapy in Holbæk, Denmark.

Seppel is best known for her prose for children's books and her poetry. In addition, she has appeared as a lyric translator from various Turkic languages (Turkish, Azerbaijani, Uzbek, Kazakh, Tatar and Turkmen), Russian and Finnish. With her husband, she translated a selection of stories from One Thousand and One Nights into Estonian from Russian in 1984.

Seppel married the Estonian poet Andres Ehin in 1975. The couple had three daughters, one of whom is Kristiina Ehin.

Selected works

Poetry
Igal hommikul avan peo (1965)
Ma kardan ja armastan (1973)
Varjuring ümber tule (1974)
Ajasära (2003)
Mälujuur=The Root of Memory (2009)

Children's books
Kaarini ja Eeva raamat (1981)
Unenäoraamat (1984)

References

1951 births
Living people
People from Haapsalu
Estonian women poets
Estonian translators
Translators from Azerbaijani
Translators from Finnish
Translators from Kazakh
Translators from Russian
Translators from Tatar
Translators from Turkish
Translators from Turkmen
Translators from Uzbek
Translators to Estonian
University of Tartu alumni
20th-century Estonian poets
21st-century Estonian poets
21st-century Estonian women writers
20th-century Estonian women writers
Recipients of the Order of the White Star, 5th Class